compress is a Unix shell compression program based on the LZW compression algorithm. Compared to gzip's fastest setting, compress is slightly slower at compression, slighty faster at decompression, and has a significantly lower compression ratio. 1.8 MiB of memory is used to compress the Hutter Prize data, slightly more than gzip's slowest setting.

The uncompress utility will restore files to their original state after they have been compressed using the compress utility. If no files are specified, the standard input will be uncompressed to the standard output.

In the upcoming POSIX and Single Unix Specification revision, it is planned that DEFLATE algorithm used in gzip format be supported in those utilities.

Description of program 
Files compressed by compress are typically given the extension ".Z" (modeled after the earlier pack program which used the extension ".z"). Most tar programs will pipe their data through compress when given the command line option "-Z". (The tar program in its own does not compress; it just stores multiple files within one tape archive.)

Files can be returned to their original state using uncompress. The usual action of uncompress is not merely to create an uncompressed copy of the file, but also to restore the timestamp and other attributes of the compressed file.

For files produced by compress on other systems, uncompress supports 9- to 16-bit compression.

History 
Terry Welch published an IEEE article on the algorithm in 1984, but failed to note that he had applied for a patent on the algorithm. Spencer Thomas of the University of Utah took this article and implemented  in 1984, without realizing that a patent was pending on the LZW algorithm. The GIF image format also incorporated LZW compression in this way, and Unisys later claimed royalties on implementations of GIF.

The US LZW patent expired in 2003, so it is now in the public domain in the United States. All patents on the LZW worldwide have also expired (see Graphics Interchange Format#Unisys and LZW patent enforcement).

In the up-coming POSIX and Single Unix Specification revision, it is planned that DEFLATE algorithm used in gzip format be supported in those utilities.

Special output format 
Output binary consists of bit groups. Each bit group consists of codes with fixed amount of bits (9-16). Each group (except last) should be aligned by amount of bits multiplied by 8 and right padded with zeroes. Last group should be aligned by 8 and padded with zeroes. You can find more information in ncompress issue.

Example:
You want to output ten 9-bit codes, five 10-bit codes and thirteen 11-bit codes. You now have three groups of bits that you want to output: 90 bits, 50 bits and 143 bits.
 First group should then be 90 bits of data + 54 zero bits of padding in order to be aligned to 72 bits (9 bits × 8).
 Second group should then be 50 bits of data + 30 zero bits of padding in order to be aligned to 80 bits (10 bits × 8).
 Third group should then be 143 bits of data + 1 zero bit of padding in order to be aligned to 8 bits (1 byte only, since this is the last group in the output).

It is actually a bug. LZW doesn't require any alignment. This bug is a part of original UNIX compress, ncompress, gzip and even windows port. It exists more than 35 years. All application/x-compress files were created using this bug. So we have to include it in output specification.

Some compress implementations write random bits from uninitialized buffer as alignment bits. There is no guarantee that alignment bits will be zeroes. So in terms of 100% compatibility decompressor have to just ignore alignment bit values.

Standardization and availability 
compress was standardized in X/Open CAE Specification in 1994, and further in The Open Group Base Specifications, Issue 6 and 7. Linux Standard Base does not requires compress.

compress is often not installed by default in Linux distributions, but can be installed from an additional package. compress is available for FreeBSD, OpenBSD, MINIX, Solaris and AIX.

See also 
 Data compression
 Image compression
 List of Unix commands
 gzip

References

External links 
 
 
 
 
 
 ncompress - public domain compress/uncompress implementation for POSIX systems
 compress - original Unix compress (in a compress'd archive)
 compress - original Unix compress executable (gzip'd)
 Source Code for compress v4.0 (gzip'd sharchives)
 ZIP File containing a Windows port of the compress utility
 source code to the current version of fcompress.c from compress
 bit groups alignment - Explanation of bit groups alignment.
 lzws - New library and CLI, implemented without legacy code.
 ruby-lzws - Ruby bindings with streaming support.
 compress.com - official website for file compression.

Data compression software
Unix archivers and compression-related utilities
Standard Unix programs
Unix SUS2008 utilities
IBM i Qshell commands